Gustavo Giussani (born 6 March 1968) is a former professional tennis player from Argentina.

Biography
Nicknamed "Pancho", Salta born Giussani was based in Cordoba.

In 1988 he won Challenger titles in Geneva and Bogota.

His best performance on the international circuit came in the doubles at the 1989 Athens Open. He partnered with countryman Gerardo Mirad to finish runners-up, to Claudio Panatta and Tomáš Šmíd. In singles that year he made the quarter-finals at a Grand Prix event in Saint Vincent and had a win over Guillermo Vilas in a Cairo Challenger tournament.

He now works as a tennis talent scout.

Grand Prix career finals

Doubles: 1 (0–1)

Challenger titles

Singles: (3)

Doubles: (1)

References

External links
 
 

1968 births
Living people
Argentine male tennis players
Sportspeople from Córdoba, Argentina